Edie is a feminine given name, often a diminutive form (hypocorism) of Edith, as well as a surname. It may refer to:

People

Given name
 Edie Adams (1927–2008), American businesswoman, singer, actress and comedian
 Edie Boyer (born 1966), American retired discus thrower
 Edie Brickell (born 1966), American singer/songwriter and guitarist.
 Edie Campbell (born 1990), English model
Edie Fake (born 1980), American artist and author
 Edie Falco (born 1963), American actress
 Edie Huggins (1935–2008), American television reporter, journalist and broadcaster
 Edie McClurg (born 1951), American stand-up comedian, actress, singer and voice actress
 Edie Meidav, 21st century Canadian-born American novelist
 Edie Parker (1922–1993), American memoirist, first wife of Jack Kerouac
 Edie Sedgwick (1943–1971), American heiress, socialite, actress and fashion model
 Edith Vonnegut (born 1949), American painter, daughter of author Kurt Vonnegut and former wife of Geraldo Rivera
 Edith Windsor (born 1929) is an American lesbian, gay, bisexual and transgender (LGBT) rights activist, lead plaintiff in the US Supreme Court case United States v. Windsor

Surname
 James M. Edie (1927–1998), American philosopher
 John Edie (New Zealand politician) (1856-1928), Member of Parliament in Otago, New Zealand
 John Rufus Edie, (1814-1888), member of the U.S. House of Representatives

Fictional characters
 Edie, played by Sheila Hancock in the 2017 film Edie
 Edie, a main character in the 1954 film On the Waterfront
 Edie Britt, on the television series Desperate Housewives
 Edith Hughes (As the World Turns), on the soap opera As the World Turns from 1956 to 1960
 Edie Ochiltree, in Sir Walter Scott's 1816 novel The Antiquary
 Edie Miller, on the television series NY-LON
 Edie Freehold, an elderly woman on the television series The Middle
Edie, a minor character on the television series This Is Us

See also
 Edith Ewing Bouvier Beale (1895-1977), American socialite and eccentric nicknamed "Big Edie", mother of Edith Bouvier Beale
 Edith Bouvier Beale (1917–2002), American socialite, fashion model and cabaret performer nicknamed "Little Edie"
Eddie (given name)
Eddy (surname)
Edey, surname

Feminine given names
Hypocorisms